Sant'Onofrio al Gianicolo is a titular church in Trastevere, Rome. It is the official church of the papal order of knighthood Order of the Holy Sepulchre. A side chapel is dedicated to the Order and a former grand master, Nicola Canali is entombed there. It is located on the Janiculum. Since 1946, the church has been under the care of the American congregation of the Franciscan Friars of the Atonement.

History
The monastery was built around 1439 on the site of a hermitage founded two decades earlier by Nicola da Forca Palena and is dedicated is to St Onuphrius, a 4th century Egyptian hermit. The attached cloister was added in the mid-15th century.

The "Salita di Sant'Onofrio", a rather steep driveway to the monastery, was used as a location for the 1958 film Big Deal on Madonna Street. 

Cardinal Carlo Furno (†2015) was the most recent Cardinal-Priest.

Architecture
Behind the Renaissance portico are three lunettes by Domenichino, painted in 1605, commemorating the hermits who lived here and depicting scenes from the life of St Jerome. The fountain in the center of the churchyard was assembled from salvage partly from the destroyed Piazza Giudia’s fountain. When the latter was re-created as the Fontana di Piazza della Cinque Scole, the one at the monastery was given modern bits to replace those taken back. The original tomb slab of the founder, Blessed Nicholas of Forca Palena, is on the wall to the right of the church entrance.

Interior
The church has a single cross-vaulted nave with five chapels. 
The church also contains an altarpiece, The Madonna of Loreto by Agostino Carracci, (his only work in a church in Rome) and frescoes in the apse of Scenes from the Life of Mary, attributed to Baldassare Peruzzi.
 Next to the main altar is a Monument to Giovanni Sacco attributed to the school of Andrea Bregno with frescoes of St. Anne Teaching the Virgin to Read by a painter of the Umbrian school.
 The first chapel to the right has an Annunciation by Antoniazzo Romano and an Eternal Father attributed to Baldassarre Peruzzi. 
 The second chapel has frescoes and stuccoes (1605) by Giovanni Battista Ricci with an altarpiece of the Madonna di Loreto by pupils of Annibale Carracci.
 In the first chapel to the left, is a monument to Torquato Tasso (1857) by Giuseppe De Fabris.
 In the second chapel is a Trinity fresco on the ceiling by Francesco Trevisani.  
 In the third chapel on the left, is a monument of the Cardinal-Priest Filippo Sega with a portrait by Domenichino.

The sacristy ceiling has frescoes by Girolamo Pesci, while the walls have a Peter of Pisa by Francesco Trevisani. The cloister, which is perhaps the oldest part of the complex, has frescoes by the Cavaliere d'Arpino (Giuseppe Cesari) and others depicting scenes from the life of Saint Onuphrius.

Burials
 Blessed Nicola da Forca Palena
 Cardinal Filippo Sega

Gallery

Tasso
Torquato Tasso, the author of Gerusalemme Liberata, the epic poem that retells the deeds of the crusaders who fought to regain possession of the Holy Sepulchre, requested and obtained shelter at the monastery of Sant'Onofrio after wandering all over Italy. He spent the last years of his life there, dying in the cloister on 25 April 1595, the evening before he was to be crowned with laurels on the Capitoline Hill. The monastery houses a collection of manuscripts and editions of his work, as well as his death mask, in the Museo Tassiano.

References

Sources

Rome Art Lover
Roma City 
Death mask of Torquato Tasso

Roman Catholic churches completed in 1439
15th-century Roman Catholic church buildings in Italy
Titular churches
Order of the Holy Sepulchre
Churches of Rome (rione Trastevere)